is a passenger railway station  located in Kita-ku Kobe, Hyōgo Prefecture, Japan. It is operated by the private transportation company, Kobe Electric Railway (Shintetsu).

Lines

Station layout
The station consists of one island platform with an elevated station building. The effective length of the platform is 4 cars, but there is space for extending the platform. The double track continuing from Okaba Station ends on the north side of the station.

Platforms

Adjacent stations

History
On 18 December 1928, the station was opened with the opening of the Sanda Line.

Passenger statistics
In fiscal 2019, the station was used by an average of 4,697 passengers daily

Surrounding area
The area around the station is a residential area. Although it is located in Kobe, the station is also close to the city border with Nishinomiya and is used by many residents there.

See also
List of railway stations in Japan

References

External links 

 Official home page 

Railway stations in Kobe
Railway stations in Japan opened in 1928